The 1930 Brown Bears football team represented Brown University as an independent during the 1930 college football season. Led by fifth-year head coach Tuss McLaughry, the Bears compiled an overall record of 6–3–1.

Schedule

References

Brown
Brown Bears football seasons
Brown Bears football